Frente Juvenil Revolucionario (FJR) is the youth organization of the Mexican Partido Revolucionario Institucional PRI. The main activities is the formation of young men and women that want to participate in political life in Mexico. This youth organization was a member of the World Federation of Democratic Youth.

Institutional Revolutionary Party
Youth wings of social democratic parties